The 2004 UC Davis football team represented the University of California, Davis as a member of the Great West Conference (GWC) during the 2004 NCAA Division I-AA football season. Led by 12th-year head coach Bob Biggs, UC Davis compiled an overall record of 6–4 with a mark of 3–2 in conference play, placing second in the GWC. 2004 was the 35th consecutive winning season for the Aggies. The team outscored their opponents 323 to 211 for the season. The Aggies played home games at Toomey Field in Davis, California.

This was the first season that UC Davis competed at the NCAA Division I-AA level.

Schedule

NFL Draft
No UC Davis Aggies players were selected in the 2005 NFL Draft.
The following players finished their UC Davis career in 2004, were not drafted, but played in the NFL:

References

UC Davis
UC Davis Aggies football seasons
UC Davis Aggies football